Harold Kelley was a social psychologist.

Harold Kelley may also refer to:

Harold Kelley (rugby league)
Harold Killian Kelley, awarded Knox Trophy

See also
Harold Kelly (disambiguation)
Harry Kelley (disambiguation)